Object Oberon is a programming language which is based on the language Oberon with features for object-oriented programming. Oberon-2 was essentially a redesign of Object Oberon.

References

Modula programming language family
Oberon programming language family
Object-oriented programming languages